Unconditional Love is the eighteenth studio album by American singer Peabo Bryson. It was released in the United States by Private Music, a division of the Windham Hill Group, on April 27, 1999. Bryson, along with Regina Troupe, produced the majority of the album himself, but also worked with Masaru Nishiyama and frequent collaborator Robbie Buchanan on several tracks. It peaked at no. 75 on the US Top R&B/Hip-Hop Albums chart.

Critical reception

Allmusic editor Andrew Hamilton found that Bryson "still exudes a highbrow persona on this late-'90s CD, excelling on "Did You Ever Know," "Ain't Nobody" (the old Rufus song), the umpteenth rendition of Leon Russell's "A Song for You," "The Gift" (a duet with Roberta Flack), and "Light the World," with Deborah Gibson. Pure Peabo, but it carbons previous albums and is only essential to a completist."

Track listing 

Notes
  denotes co-producer

Personnel and credits 
Musicians

 Peabo Bryson – lead vocals, Rhodes (1–3, 5–9, 11), strings (1–3, 5–9, 11), bass (1–3, 5–9, 11), bells (1–3, 5–9, 11)
 Regina Troupe – acoustic piano (1–3, 5–9, 11), Rhodes (1–3, 5–9, 11), synthesizers (1–3, 5–9, 11), strings (1–3, 5–9, 11), guitars (1–3, 5–9, 11), bass (1–3, 5–9, 11), drum programming (1–3, 5–9, 11), bells (1–3, 5–9, 11), backing vocals (1–3, 5–9, 11)
 Robbie Buchanan – keyboards (4, 10, 12), drums (4, 10), bass (10), acoustic piano (12), organ (12), synth bass (12), drum programming (12), orchestrations (12)
 Tom Keane – keyboards (13), programming (13), strings (13)
 Derek Scott – electric guitar (9)
 Paul Jackson Jr. – guitar (10)
 James Harrah – guitar (12)
 Robbie Steininger – guitar (12)
 Michael Landau – guitar (13)
 Brian Newcombe – bass (4, 11)
 Dwight Watkins – bass (5), backing vocals (7)
 Jerry Adolphe – drums (12)
 Michael Hoskin – saxophone (5, 9)
 Pat Caird – saxophone (12)
 Dave Boruff – saxophone (13)
 Scott Erickson – orchestral transcripts (12)
 September Gray – backing vocals (2, 7)
 Tania Hancheroff – backing vocals (10)
 Sean Hosein – backing vocals (10)
 Warren Stayner – backing vocals (10)
 Roberta Flack – lead vocals (12)
 Debbie Gibson – lead vocals (13)

Production

 Patrick Clifford – A&R 
 Andrea Franklin – A&R administration 
 Thom Kidd – recording (1–3, 5–8, 13), mixing (1–3, 5–8, 13)
 Brock Landers – mixing (9)
 Mike Alvord – mixing (11)
 Bill Buckingham – BGV recording (10)
 Jeremy Smith – additional engineer (3), recording (4, 10, 12), mixing (4, 10, 12)
 Robbie Buchanan – additional overdubs (3), remixing (3)
 Shawn Grove – additional engineer (5)
 Mike Colomby – additional vocal recording (12)
 Eric Tew – additional vocal recording (12)
 Stephanie Vonarx – assistant engineer (1, 3, 6–8)
 Dallas Shumaker – assistant engineer (2)
 Scott Erickson – assistant engineer (3, 4), production assistant (4, 10)
 Johnny Q – assistant engineer (4)
 Robert Hannon – assistant engineer (5)
 Chest Rockwell – assistant engineer (9)
 John Horesco IV – assistant engineer (11)
 Sheldon Zaharko – mix assistant (3, 4, 10)
 Nathaniel Kunkel – mastering 
 Sonny Mediana – art direction 
 Sanae Robertson – design
 E.J. Camp – photography

Studios

 Recorded at Silent Sound Studios, P.B. Music Studio, Tree Sound Studios and DARP Studios (Atlanta, GA); Green Street Recording (New York, NY); The Hop (Studio City, CA); Andee Pandee Productions (Pasadena, CA); Mushroom Studios and Bill Buckingham Studios (Vancouver, BC); Hop North (North Vancouver, BC).
 Mixed and Remixed at The Factory Studios (Vancouver, BC).
 Mastered at Hyde Street Studios (San Francisco, CA).

Charts

References 

1999 albums
Peabo Bryson albums